Maurice Timothy Dooling Jr. (November 13, 1889 – October 18, 1965) was an associate justice of the Supreme Court of California from June 30, 1960 to June 30, 1962.

Early life and education
Dooling Jr. was born in Hollister, California, to Ida M. K. Wagner and the senior Maurice Timothy Dooling, an attorney who would later become a United States federal judge, appointed to the United States District Court for the Northern District of California by President Woodrow Wilson. Dooling Jr. graduated from San Benito County High School. He entered the University of Santa Clara at the age of 16, graduating in 1909 with a B.A.  and named as both the class treasurer and poet. He received a second B.A. from Stanford University in 1911, and a J.D. from the Stanford Law School in 1913, where he was one of the top students.

Legal and judicial career
The Stanford Dean recommended that San Francisco city attorney George Lull hire Dooling, who then worked at the city attorney's office into the 1920s. In 1921, he successfully represented the city before the Supreme Court of the United States in a case concerning the city's power to remove an unpermitted house built in the 1906 fire zone. After leaving the city attorney, he began a private practice.

In 1928, Governor C. C. Young appointed Dooling as a superior court judge of San Benito County, a position his father had held. In December 1937, he upheld a union's right to picket in front of a business. In June 1940, after the outbreak of World War II, Governor Culbert Olson appointed Dooling as San Benito county chairman of recruiting for the armed forces, should America join the conflict.

In 1945, Dooling was named an Associate Justice in the California Court of Appeal, First District, by Governor Earl Warren.

In June 1960, Governor Pat Brown appointed Dooling as Associate Justice to the California Supreme Court, to fill the vacancy from the resignation of Homer R. Spence. Among the notable cases Dooling voted on is the pair in 1961 arising out of the American Civil Liberties Union of Southern California lawsuits against the Boards of Education of both the cities of Los Angeles and San Diego. He joined the 4-3 majority opinion that held public school districts could not constitutionally require a loyalty oath, or "statement of information," from members of the public seeking to use a school building to hold meetings. In October 1961, the U.S. Supreme Court declined to review the decision. Dooling served on the court until June 30, 1962, when he resigned at 72 years of age.

After stepping down from the bench he continued to occasionally sit by designation on the Supreme Court. On October 18, 1965, he died in San Francisco.

Personal life
In 1916, he married Mary Devlin, the daughter of a family friend, who was active in Democratic politics. They had two daughters: Mary M. ("Marjorie") Dooling and Alma Dooling.

See also
 List of justices of the Supreme Court of California

References

Further reading

External links
Maurice T. Dooling Jr.. California Supreme Court Historical Society. 
 In Memoriam. California Supreme Court, 63 Cal. 2d 833 (1966).
 Opinions authored by Maurice T. Dooling: California Supreme Court and Court of Appeal. Courtlistener.com
 
 

1889 births
1965 deaths
Superior court judges in the United States
Justices of the Supreme Court of California
Judges of the California Courts of Appeal
Lawyers from San Francisco
20th-century American judges
People from Hollister, California
Santa Clara University alumni
Stanford University alumni
Stanford Law School alumni
California Democrats
20th-century American lawyers